Foria is a village (frazione) of the municipality of Centola in the Province of Salerno, Campania, Italy.

Demographics
In 2011, the population of Foria was of 516.

Transportation
Foria is served by Salerno provincial roads SR 447, SR 447a, and SP 109.

References

Frazioni of the Province of Salerno
Localities of Cilento